Experience (also known as The Prodigy Experience) is the debut studio album by English electronic music group the Prodigy. It was first released on 28 September 1992 by XL Recordings in the United Kingdom and by Elektra Records in the United States.

Album information 

Apart from Liam Howlett - who was the sole composer - of the additional three members at that time, only Maxim Reality actually contributed to the album, performing the vocals on the last track. A wide variety of artists in the breakbeat hardcore scene in the early 1990s are given respect and namechecked in the sleeve notes of the album, including SL2, Carl Cox, Moby, Tim Westwood, Orbital and Aphex Twin. Experience peaked at No. 12 in the UK Albums Chart and went on to achieve platinum status in that country. It also went gold in Poland.

Reception 

From contemporary reviews, Kris Needs of NME declared that "the time-pod to enable future generations to get a handle on what happened in 1992, The Prodigy's debut album will be a much safer bet to illustrate the Rave Phenomenon than any half-assed "40 Bowel-Erupting Rave Greats" compilation. If only to show what killed it, some would say."

Experience received very positive reviews upon its release. AllMusic gave the album 5 out of 5 stars, saying that it "shows the Prodigy near the peak of their game from the get go" and stating that "almost every song sounds like a potential chart topper". Tom Ewing of Freaky Trigger commended the album as "four-minute-warnings, [...] hyperactive ravey blasts which boasted genuine irreverence rather than learned attitude."

Moby credited Experience with changing his perception about dance albums; previously he felt that "dance albums had always failed [...] because they didn't work over the full length of the record. Mostly they were singles collections which was exactly what I didn't want to do," and noted that Experience "impressed me because they'd managed to create a full listening experience which encompassed various styles. This was the kind of vision I had for my debut album."

Track listing

Personnel 
 Liam Howlett – production, keyboards, synthesizers, sampling, programming, engineering
 Maxim Reality – vocals on "Death of the Prodigy Dancers (Live)"
 Simone – vocals on "Music Reach (1/2/3/4)", "Ruff in the Jungle Bizness" and "Rip Up the Sound System" (non-album song)
 Alex Garland – artwork
 Mike Champion – management

Charts

Weekly charts

Certifications

References

Sources

External links 
 

The Prodigy albums
1992 debut albums
Rave albums
XL Recordings albums
Breakbeat hardcore albums
Albums produced by Liam Howlett